Tic Tac Toe is the debut studio album by German all-female pop-rap band Tic Tac Toe, released in 1996 by RCA Records. The lyrics and music were written by the band's manager Claudia Wohlfromm, her then-husband Torsten Börger, who also produced the album, and the band itself.

The album featured the band's popular debut single "Ich find' dich scheiße" which reached the top 5 in Germany and Austria, as well as their first number-one hit "Verpiss' dich". The album reached the top 5 in Germany, Austria and Switzerland, where it earned platinum and multi-platinum certifications.

Track listing

Charts

Weekly charts

Year-end charts

Certifications

References 

1996 debut albums
German-language albums
Tic Tac Toe (band) albums